Lee Peart (born 16 July 1990) is an English comedian, actor, and presenter.

Early life and education 
Peart grew up in Cleethorpes and attended The Humberston School in Humberston.

He studied performing arts at the University of Salford, where he graduated with 1st Class Honours.

Career

Comedy 
In 2010, Peart became a regular on the UK comedy circuit while studying for his degree. In 2012 he took part in the BBC New Comedy Award and Chortle Student Comedian of the Year Award.

Peart replaced comic Helen Keeler for a gig in 2015 after she was dropped for "being a woman". Taking a stand against sexism in comedy, Peart and fellow comics refused to perform unless Keeler was reinstated.

In 2017, Peart became the warm-up on ITV's daily magazine panel-show Loose Women.

In October 2021 he spoke out regarding the stereotypes he has received as an openly gay stand-up comic, stating audiences "expect a certain style of comedy based purely on his sexuality". He also notes that as a gay comic he felt he always has to address his sexual identity, stating "If we don't, we'll never have the audience on our side, they'll always be on edge."

In 2022 Peart supported Jason Manford on his UK stand-up tour.

On 3 July 2022 it was announced that Loose Women will bring back their studio audience for the first time since the Covid-19 pandemic, and Peart would be returning as their resident warm-up.

Acting 
Peart toured the UK in 2016 with Three Days and Three Minutes with Larry, a show about the life of British comedian Larry Grayson.

Radio 
Peart regularly contributes on talkRADIO, and was previously a presenter on Gaydio.

Personal life 
Peart is openly gay and a vocal supporter of LGBT equality. He has connections working with George House Trust and Manchester Pride. In 2012, during Manchester Pride, he hosted a candlelit vigil in honor of those who have died of HIV/AIDS. He described the vigil as "one of the most amazing experiences of my career to date". In 2022, Peart appeared on Good Morning Britain discussing the importance of Pride.

References 

1990 births
Living people
English gay actors
Gay comedians
English comedians
British LGBT rights activists
People from Cleethorpes
21st-century English comedians
British LGBT comedians